Quei due sopra il varano is an Italian sitcom.

Cast

Enzo Iacchetti as Enzo Riboldazzi
Lello Arena as Lello Cardella
Eleonora Cajafa as Nora
Remo Remotti as  Nora's Father

See also
List of Italian television series

External links
 

Italian television series
1996 Italian television series debuts
1996 Italian television series endings
1990s Italian television series
Canale 5 original programming